Five Billion Pinheads Can't Be Wrong is the fourteenth studio album by experimental rock composer Zoogz Rift, released in 1996 by AVT Records.

Track listing

Personnel 
Adapted from the Five Billion Pinheads Can't Be Wrong liner notes.
 Zoogz Rift – lead vocals, guitar, bass guitar, synthesizer, production
Musicians
 Tom Brown – percussion
 Aaron Rift – alto saxophone, keyboards, additional vocals
 Terry Saunders – additional vocals
 Robert Arthur Williams – drums

Release history

References

External links 
 Five Billion Pinheads Can't Be Wrong at iTunes
 Five Billion Pinheads Can't Be Wrong at Discogs (list of releases)

1996 albums
Zoogz Rift albums